Set Sail may refer to:

 Set Sail (The Movement album), 2008
 Set Sail (North Mississippi Allstars album), 2022